Salvatore Matrecano (born 5 October 1970) is an Italian former footballer turned football coach, who played as a defender. He was most recently head coach of the Serie C team Paganese.

Club career
During his career, Matrecano played for several clubs including the Italian sides Parma and Perugia, and the English side Nottingham Forest.

International career
At international level, Matrecano represented Italy at the 1992 Summer Olympics.

References

External links
 

1970 births
Living people
Italian footballers
Footballers from Sardinia
Association football defenders
Serie A players
Serie B players
Serie C players
S.S. Turris Calcio players
Torino F.C. players
Udinese Calcio players
Calcio Foggia 1920 players
S.S.C. Napoli players
Parma Calcio 1913 players
A.C. Perugia Calcio players
Benevento Calcio players
Nottingham Forest F.C. players
Italy under-21 international footballers
Olympic footballers of Italy
Footballers at the 1992 Summer Olympics
Italian football managers
Italian expatriate footballers
Italian expatriate sportspeople in England
Expatriate footballers in England